Acústico MTV is a musical television program originally aired by MTV Brasil, inspired by the series MTV Unplugged, an American program created in 1989 where bands and artists play their music in an acoustic version, that is, with acoustic and non-electric instruments.

Initially, Acústico MTV was born as a television program and, as a result, became a music label. For the Brazilian music industry, the series took the music market to its peak.

With the end of MTV Brasil's management by Grupo Abril in September 2013, the station stopped producing the program. Therefore, the last acoustic one was with Arnaldo Antunes. However, in November 2018, Viacom (current owner of the rights to MTV Brasil) announced that it was returning with the project, as it is part of a strategy to reposition MTV in Brazil. The first guest artist was Tiago Iorc.

Albums

Official albums 
 (1992) Acústico MTV: João Bosco
(1994) Acústico MTV: Gilberto Gil
(1995) Acústico MTV: Moraes Moreira
(1997) Acústico MTV: Titãs
(1997) Acústico MTV: Gal Costa
(1998) Acústico MTV: Rita Lee
 (1999) Acústico MTV: Os Paralamas do Sucesso
 (1999) Acústico MTV: Legião Urbana (recorded in 1992)
(2000) Acústico MTV: Capital Inicial
(2000) Acústico MTV: Art Popular
(2000) Acústico MTV: Lulu Santos
 (2001) Acústico MTV: Cássia Eller
(2001) Acústico MTV: Roberto Carlos
(2002) Acústico MTV: Cidade Negra
(2002) Acústico MTV: Jorge Ben Jor
(2002) Acústico MTV: Kid Abelha
(2003) Acústico MTV: Marina Lima
 (2003) Acústico MTV: Charlie Brown Jr.
(2003) Acústico MTV: Zeca Pagodinho
(2004) Acústico MTV: Ira!
(2004) Acústico MTV: Marcelo D2
(2004) Acústico MTV: Engenheiros do Hawaii
(2005) Acústico MTV: Bandas Gaúchas (recorded by Bidê ou Balde, Cachorro Grande, Ultramen and Wander Wildner)
(2005) Acústico MTV: Ultraje a Rigor
 (2005) Acústico MTV: O Rappa
(2006) Acústico MTV: Lenine
(2006) Acústico MTV: Zeca Pagodinho 2 – Gafieira
(2007) Acústico MTV: Lobão
(2007) Acústico MTV: Sandy & Junior
(2007) Acústico MTV: Paulinho da Viola
(2010) Acústico MTV: Lulu Santos II
(2012) Acústico MTV: Arnaldo Antunes
(2019) Acústico MTV: Tiago Iorc

Unofficial albums 

 Acústico MTV: Marcelo Nova (pilot program, never shown by the broadcaster)
 (2006) Acústico MTV: Barão Vermelho (recorded in 1991; released only on DVD)

See also
 Acústico (disambiguation)

 
Live albums by Brazilian artists